Coballes (Asturian: Coballes)  is one of ten parishes (administrative divisions) in Caso, a municipality within the province and autonomous community of Asturias, in northern Spain. 

The postal code is 33995.

Villages and hamlets
 Buspriz
 Coballes

References

Parishes in Caso